Joachim Heinz Ehrig (born 15 November 1951), better known by his stage name Eroc, is a German musician and sound engineer. He served as the drummer and band leader of the German progressive rock group Grobschnitt from 1970 until 1983. He also released five solo albums between 1975 and 1987.

Discography

Solo albums 
 Eroc (1975), Brain
 Eroc Zwei (1976), Brain
 Eroc 3 (1979), Brain
 Eroc 4 (1982), Brain
 Changing Skies (1987), Metronome

With Hans Reichel 
 Kino (1986), Teldec Import Service
 The Return of Onkel Boskopp (1997), Repertoire

With Urs Fuchs 
 Eurosonic Experiences (1999), Wolkenreise

References

External links
 Official website

German electronic musicians
German drummers
Male drummers
German male musicians
1951 births
Living people
Krautrock
Brain Records artists
Warner Music Sweden artists